The India cricket team toured South Africa in January and February 2018 to play three Tests, six One Day Internationals (ODIs) and three Twenty20 International (T20I) matches. In January 2017, Cricket South Africa (CSA) revealed that this tour would replace the scheduled visit by Sri Lanka due to costs and scheduling congestion. The Test series was played for the Freedom Trophy, with South Africa winning the trophy following victories in the first two Tests. South Africa went on to win the Test series 2–1. It was the first Test series of three matches or more in which all 40 wickets fell in each match of the series. With India's win the third Test, they retained the number one place in the ICC Test Championship, taking an unassailable lead before the April 2018 cut-off date for next season's rankings.

In August 2017, it was announced that the traditional Boxing Day Test at Kingsmead will not take place, as India's home series against Sri Lanka will not conclude until 24 December 2017. The following month it was announced that tour would likely to start on 5 January 2018. CSA confirmed the fixtures in September 2017. Before the Test matches, India were scheduled to play in a two-day warm-up match at Boland Park, Paarl. However, this was cancelled, as India opted to do training sessions instead of the match.

The Test series marked Dale Steyn's return to international cricket. He last played in a Test match for South Africa in November 2016 against Australia in Perth, where he suffered a shoulder injury. However, on day two of the first Test, Steyn damaged his left heel. This ruled him out of the rest of the Test, with a recovery time of 4 to 6 weeks. Two days later, he was ruled out of the rest of the series.

During the first ODI, South Africa's captain, Faf du Plessis, suffered a finger injury and was ruled out of the remaining ODI matches. Aiden Markram was named as South Africa's captain for the remaining ODI fixtures, becoming the second-youngest South African to lead South Africa in ODIs.

India ensured an ODI series victory after beating South Africa by 73 runs in the fifth match, after they had already won the first three fixtures. This resulted in India's first ODI series win in South Africa, with India maintaining their number one ranking in the ICC ODI Championship. India went on to win the ODI series 5–1. Virat Kohli scored the most runs in a bilateral ODI series by a player, with 558. India were also victorious in the T20I matches, winning the series 2–1.

Squads

Duanne Olivier and Lungi Ngidi were added to South Africa's squad for the second Test after Dale Steyn suffered an injury during the first Test. Dinesh Karthik was called up as replacement to India's Test squad for Wriddhiman Saha after Saha was ruled out of the series due to an injury in training. Temba Bavuma suffered a finger injury in a domestic one-day game and was ruled out of South Africa's squad ahead of the third and final Test. South Africa's AB de Villiers was ruled out of first three ODIs due to a finger injury. He was added back into South Africa's squad for the final three matches.

Following the first ODI, Faf du Plessis was ruled out of South Africa's squad for the remaining ODI matches and the T20I series, after suffering a finger injury. Du Plessis was replaced by Farhaan Behardien in the ODI squad and Heinrich Klaasen was added to South Africa's squad as a reserve wicket-keeper. Aiden Markram was named as captain of South Africa for the remaining ODIs in du Plessis' absence. South Africa's Quinton de Kock suffered an injury during the second ODI and was ruled out of the rest of the ODI matches and the T20I series.

AB de Villiers was ruled out of South Africa's squad for the T20I series after suffering an injury before the fifth ODI match.

Test series

1st Test

2nd Test

3rd Test

ODI series

1st ODI

2nd ODI

3rd ODI

4th ODI

5th ODI

6th ODI

T20I series

1st T20I

2nd T20I

3rd T20I

Notes

References

External links
 Series home at ESPN Cricinfo

2018 in Indian cricket
2018 in South African cricket
International cricket competitions in 2017–18
Indian cricket tours of South Africa